Tons of Money is a 1924 British silent comedy film directed by Frank Hall Crane and starring Leslie Henson, Flora le Breton and Mary Brough. It is an adaptation of the 1922 play Tons of Money by Will Evans and Arthur Valentine.  Both were co-produced with Tom Walls.  It was remade as a sound film Tons of Money in 1930.

Cast
 Leslie Henson as Aubrey Allington
 Flora le Breton as Louise Allington
 Mary Brough as Mrs. Mullet
 Clifford Seyler as George Maitland
 Jack Denton as Henry
 Elsie Fuller as Jean Everard
 Douglas Munro as Sprules
 Roy Byford as Chesterman
 Willie Warde as Giles
 Ena Mason as Simpson - the maid

References

External links

1924 films
1924 comedy films
Films directed by Frank Hall Crane
British comedy films
British silent feature films
Films set in England
Stoll Pictures films
British films based on plays
British black-and-white films
1920s English-language films
1920s British films
Silent comedy films